This is a list of the extreme points of Turkmenistan: the points that are farther north, south, east or west than any other location, as well as the highest and lowest points in the country.

Latitude and longitude

Altitude

See also 
 Extreme points of Asia
 Extreme points of Earth
 Geography of Turkmenistan

References

External links 
 http://enrin.grida.no/htmls/turkmen/soe/htmrus/geogr.htm
 http://turkmenistan-rus.wikispaces.com/mary-geography

Lists of coordinates
Turkmenistan
Geography of Turkmenistan